Big Bad (abbreviated to BB or BBEG for big bad evil guy) is a term to describe a major recurring adversary, usually the chief villain or antagonist in a particular broadcast season, originally used by the Buffy the Vampire Slayer television series. It has since been used to describe annual villains in other television series, and has also been used in scholarly work discussing Buffy the Vampire Slayer.

On Buffy the Vampire Slayer 
The term "Big Bad" was originally used on American television program Buffy the Vampire Slayer (which aired 1997–2003). According to author Kevin Durand (2009), "While Buffy confronts various forms of evil during each episode, each season of Buffy the Vampire Slayer had its own 'big bad' villain who dominates throughout the season. The power of the 'big bad' always threatens to end the world, but Buffy ultimately overcomes him or her in the season finale." The series balanced its episodic stories with advancing that season's big bad story arc.

The term was originally used in the episode "Bewitched, Bothered and Bewildered", in which Buffy Summers describes the newly soulless Angel as "the big, bad thing in the dark". The prior episode, "Phases", has Xander Harris "being" the werewolf and saying, "I'm the big, bad wolf." The phrase may originate in various fairy tales (particularly "Three Little Pigs" and the related song) about the "Big Bad Wolf". The phrase "big bad" by itself as a noun was first used on screen in Season 3, in the episode "Gingerbread" where Buffy says that an occult symbol is harmless, "not a big bad". Slang generation was encouraged in the writers' room. Marti Noxon, writer and eventually showrunner, said that "Big Bad" was used "long before the characters themselves started using the phrase". Using "big bad" as a noun instead of using as an adjective is a functional shift, which was done often on the show.

The first "Big Bad" villain on the program was The Master, played by Mark Metcalf.  According to author Jan Jagodzinski, the battle between Buffy and the evil Master is "the central issue of season one"; The Master, like all the "big bads", is a "symptom of postmodernity".

David Sims of The Atlantic wrote that Joss Whedon, creator of the series, made the model for the Golden Age of television:

On other television and film series 

The use of Big Bads has become common in TV science fiction and fantasy series, especially with more binge-watching of serialized shows.

In the Arrowverse, after 8 years and 20 collective seasons, the series Arrow, The Flash, Supergirl and Legends of Tomorrow had 22 Big Bads, which TVLine ranked based on "Compelling Backstory, Fearsome Appearance, Powers/Skills, Utter Ruthlessness, Eeeevilness of Agenda, Despicable Damage Done". But Den of Geek's Dave Golder questioned the continued use of the "season-long baddie" plot device.

The Doctor Who revival has occasionally used Big Bads. Jef Rouner of the Houston Press wrote how Doctor Who series 6 succeed with the "proper format," beginning with a new villain to the series, the Silence. He also wrote that for series 11, "The main villain is regular old human cruelty and apathy to suffering", adding this had some similarity to Buffy the Vampire Slayer season 6's Big Bad, “life.” But Lacy Baugher wrote on Syfy Wire that the show can have the smaller personal, emotional stories, and doesn't need the "big, sweeping arcs and grand monsters". "Each Big Bad the Doctor faced had to be the most dangerous in the universe."

In the Marvel Cinematic Universe (MCU), the Big Bad for "The Infinity Saga" was Thanos. There is speculation over which villain will be the next Big Bad for the MCU.

See also 
Boss (video gaming)

References

Further reading

External links 

 TV Tropes: Big Bad
 The Buffy Formula: Patterns in the Buffyverse on SpoilerSlayer.com
 Opposing Buffy: Power, Responsibility and the Narrative Function of the Big Bad in Buffy the Vampire Slayer, Master of Arts Thesis by Joseph Lipsett

Buffyverse
Supervillains